Sociological Methods & Research is a peer-reviewed academic journal that covers research in the field of sociology. The journal's editor-in-chief is Christopher Winship (Harvard University). It was established in 1972 and is currently published by SAGE Publications.

Abstracting and indexing 
Sociological Methods & Research is abstracted and indexed in Scopus and the Social Sciences Citation Index. According to the Journal Citation Reports, its 2017 impact factor is 3.625, ranking it 5 out of 146 journals in the category "Sociology" and 3 out of 49 journals in the category "Social Sciences, Mathematical Methods".

References

External links 
 

SAGE Publishing academic journals
English-language journals
Quarterly journals
Sociology journals
Publications established in 1972
Research methods journals